Suhang (苏杭) is the region of China encompassing the cities of Suzhou and Hangzhou (in the provinces of Jiangsu and Zhejiang, respectively)

There is a Chinese saying, 上有天堂, 下有蘇杭 / 上有天堂, 下有苏杭 (pinyin: shàng yǒu tiāntáng, xià yǒu sūháng; literally "above, there is heaven; below, there is Suzhou and Hangzhou"), referring to the legendary beauty of this region.

Geography of Suzhou
Geography of Hangzhou